Alanson B. Vaughan was a member of the Wisconsin State Assembly and the Minnesota Territorial Legislature.

Biography
Vaughan was born on June 6, 1806 in Clinton County, New York. He settled in what would become Rock County, Wisconsin in 1843. He later worked as a merchant in Lansing Township, Mower County, Minnesota. The town was in part named after Vaughan, because of the similarity to the sound of his first name. He was a member of the Assembly during the 1848 session as a Whig. From 1856 to 1857, he was a member of the House of Representatives of the Territorial Legislature as a Republican. Additionally, he was Postmaster of Lansing. He died on October 3, 1876.

References

People from Clinton County, New York
People from Rock County, Wisconsin
People from Mower County, Minnesota
Members of the Wisconsin State Assembly
Members of the Minnesota Territorial Legislature
Minnesota postmasters
Wisconsin Whigs
Minnesota Republicans
19th-century American merchants
1806 births
1876 deaths